Country Mile or A Country Mile may refer to:

Film
A Country Mile, film by David Carradine

Music
Country Mile (Ernie Smith album), 2008 album by Ernie Smith
Country Mile (Johnny Flynn album), 2013 album by Johnny Flynn
"Country Mile", 1979 song by Rory Gallagher from BBC Sessions 
"Country Mile", 1971 song by Charles Williams from Charles Williams 
"Country Mile", song by Ian Gillan from Dreamcatcher
"Country Mile", song by  Clinic from Winchester Cathedral
"Country Mile", 2006 song by Camera Obscura from Let's Get Out of This Country
"Country Mile", 2001 song by Eric Sardinas from Devil's Train
"A Country Mile", song by Everything but the Girl from Baby, the Stars Shine Bright

See also
A Good Country Mile, 2012 album by Kevin Kinney and The Golden Palominos
 mile (disambiguation)